This article describes significant photography events in 2019.

Festivals and other events

France 

 Bird and Nature Festival (Festival de l'oiseau et de la nature) – 13 to 22 April 2019
 International Photographic Federation Bièvres (Fédération photographique de France) – 1 to 2 July, 2019
 Fédération photographique de France v Aurillacu – 30 to 31 May 2019
 Rencontres d'Arles – July 1 to September 22, 2019
 Paris Photo in Grand Palais in Paris – 7 to 10 November, 2019

Awards 
  Nikon-Walkley Australian Press Photographer of the Year
  Prix Niépce
  Prix Nadar
  Prix Marc Ladreit de Lacharrière – Académie des beaux-arts
  Prix HSBC pour la photographie
  Prix Bayeux-Calvados des correspondants de guerre - Trophée photo
  Prix Carmignac du photojournalisme 
  Prix Roger-Pic
  Prix Lucas Dolega
  Prix Canon de la femme photojournaliste
  Prix Picto
  Prix Tremplin Photo de l'EMI
  Prix Voies Off
  Prix Révélation SAIF
  Prix national de portrait photographique Fernand Dumeunier
 Prix Paul-Émile-Borduas
 Prix du duc et de la duchesse d'York
 Prix Inge Morath
 Infinity Awards
 Lucie Awards
 Kimura Ihei Award
 Domon Ken Award

References 

Photography
2019-related lists